The list includes:

 Ahmad El Choum, Lebanese footballer
 Sami El Choum, Lebanese footballer
 Bahaa Hariri, Lebanese-Saudi billionaire
 Rafic Hariri, Lebanese-Saudi business tycoon and the Prime Minister of Lebanon from 1992 to 1998 and again from 2000 until his resignation on 20 October 2004.
 Saad Hariri, Lebanese-Saudi billionaire who served as the Prime Minister of Lebanon from 2009 until 2011.
 Ahmed Al Khodor, Lebanese footballer
 Ahmed Naamani, Lebanese footballer
 Mona Al Solh, former wife Prince Talal and mother of Al-Waleed bin Talal. 
 Al-Waleed bin Talal, business magnate and investor. He is a member of the Saudi royal family

See also
List of Lebanese people
List of Lebanese people (Diaspora)
Lebanese people in Saudi Arabia

References

Saudi Arabia
Lebanese
List
Lebanese